Inteligencia de la Policía Bonaerense (Buenos Aires Police Intelligence) is an internal intelligence agency of Argentina. It is the intelligence service of the police of Buenos Aires Province, and it is controlled by the Ministry of the Interior.

See also
List of Secretaries of Intelligence
Argentine intelligence agencies
National Intelligence System
National Intelligence School
Directorate of Judicial Surveillance
National Directorate of Criminal Intelligence
National Directorate of Strategic Military Intelligence

Provincial law enforcement agencies of Argentina
Argentine intelligence agencies